Eric Lynn Johnson (born October 10, 1975) is an American politician and attorney who has served as the 60th Mayor of Dallas, Texas since June 2019. He previously served as a Democratic member of the Texas House of Representatives, where he represented District 100 in the cities of Dallas and Mesquite, Texas.

Early life and education

Johnson was born on October 10, 1975, in Dallas, Texas. He attended Dallas ISD schools until the second grade, when he received a scholarship to attend Greenhill School through the West Dallas Boys & Girls Club. Johnson graduated from Greenhill School in 1994.

Johnson went on to attend Harvard University and was a resident of Cabot House. He was initiated into Kappa Alpha Psi fraternity his second year and headed up the community service efforts of both that organization and the Harvard Black Students Association, which earned him both the John Lord O’Brian and Stride Rite scholarships from Harvard College for his commitment to community service.

The summer between his junior and senior year of college, Johnson studied public policy at the Graduate School of Public Policy at the University of California at Berkeley as part of the Public Policy and International Affairs (PPIA) Fellowship Program. While at Harvard, Johnson was intensely involved with the Phillips Brooks House, Harvard's premier community service organization, where he served as the director of the Cambridge Youth Enrichment Program (CYEP), a summer program for the children who lived in the public housing projects in the city of Cambridge, Massachusetts. Johnson lived in the public housing project that he served for the duration of the summer.

After graduating from Harvard cum laude in 1998 with a degree in history, Johnson returned to Dallas to work as an investment banker with Donaldson, Lufkin & Jenrette, and then as an aide to State Representative Yvonne Davis. After the 76th Texas Legislature adjourned in May 1999, he moved to New York City for three months to work as a graduate intern for the NAACP Legal Defense and Educational Fund doing research to support several of their desegregation lawsuits in the Deep South and also to combat the proposed elimination of remedial education on City University of New York system campuses.

Johnson earned a Juris Doctor degree from the University of Pennsylvania Law School, where he was a Public Interest Scholar and a member of the Journal of International Economic Law, and a Master of Public Affairs from the School of Public and International Affairs at Princeton University, both in 2003.

Career

Law career
Johnson was admitted to the State Bar of Texas in November 2003. He previously served Of Counsel to Andrews Kurth Kenyon and Orrick, Herrington & Sutcliffe in Dallas, Texas. He is currently a partner with the international law firm of Locke Lord LLP.

Community involvement
In 2009, Johnson launched West Dallas C.A.M.P. (Community Ambassador Mentoring Program), a partnership between C.F. Carr Elementary School, Big Brothers Big Sisters, and People Empowerment Project that provides fourth grade students with one-on-one and group mentoring for success both in and out of the classroom.

In addition to his volunteer work in DISD schools, Johnson has served on the boards of several important organizations in the Dallas community. He was a member of the board of directors of the Boys & Girls Clubs of Greater Dallas (the first Boys & Girls Club of Greater Dallas alumnus ever to serve in that capacity), where he formed an alumni organization for local Boys & Girls Club alumni to mentor and support current Boys & Girls Club members, as well as the board of directors of the Martin Luther King, Jr. Community Center in South Dallas. He has also served on the boards of Educational Opportunities, Inc., an organization that provides scholarships to academically talented but economically disadvantaged DISD students, the Metro Dallas Homeless Alliance, which is responsible for operating "The Bridge" (the City of Dallas' homeless assistance center), and the West Dallas Chamber of Commerce.

Johnson is currently a member of the board of directors of the Dallas Arboretum, the West Dallas-based Voice of Hope Ministries, the Oak Cliff Chamber of Commerce, the Southwestern Medical Foundation, and the Annette Caldwell Simmons School of Education and Human Development at Southern Methodist University. He is also a member of The Dallas Assembly, the Leadership Dallas Alumni Association (Class of 2006), and the Dallas Alumni Chapter of the Kappa Alpha Psi fraternity.

Texas Legislature

Johnson was sworn in as a member of the Texas House of Representatives on April 20, 2010, filling the vacant seat that he won in a special election. He was reelected, after running uncontested, in the November elections of 2010 and 2012. He also won reelection in 2014, 2016, and 2018.

Johnson founded and served as the chairman of, the Young Texans Legislative Caucus (YTLC), which focuses on transportation, education, water, infrastructure, and other issues of interest to younger Texans. YTLC is open to Texas state representatives who are either under the age of 40 or represent a district that has a population under 40 that is greater than the state average of 58%. He is also the vice chairman of both the House Natural Resources Committee and the House General Investigating and Ethics Committee, and was the only member of the 83rd Texas Legislature to serve as vice chairman of two standing house committees. Johnson also serves on the House Elections Committee, the House Select Committee on Transparency in State Agency Operations, and the Joint House and Senate Committee on Higher Education Governance, Excellence and Transparency. He has previously served on the House Committees on Appropriations, Higher Education, and the Interim Committee on Manufacturing.

Johnson has authored legislation that ensures that vacancies in the Texas Legislature are filled in a timely manner, requires Texas courts to inform defendants being sentenced to deferred adjudication of their right to an order of nondisclosure, enables the Dallas independent school District to implement a pilot program that allows some students to graduate in three years, and that adds public and private institutions of higher education to the list of places where reporting a false bomb threat is a state jail felony. In addition, he was a joint author of the landmark water legislation passed during the 83rd Texas Legislature, House Bill 4, that will fund the State Water Plan. Upon becoming Mayor of Dallas, Johnson vacated House District 100 seat, and his successor will be determined in a special election.

After the 82nd Texas Legislature, Johnson was selected to participate in the Emerging Leaders Program by the State Legislative Leaders Foundation. Johnson has been awarded the Achievement Award from the Public Policy and International Affairs Fellowship Program, the Dallas Regional Chamber's first ever "Courage in Public Service Award" for his work in the field of higher education, and was named one of the Texas Junior Chamber of Commerce's "Five Outstanding Young Texans."

In the 86th legislature, it was found that Johnson missed 62% of votes, the highest of any legislator during this session, after having filed motions so the House can excuse, with or without a reason, him for the day's business.

Committee assignments by legislative session:

81st (2010)
 Criminal Jurisprudence
 Corrections

82nd (2011)
 Appropriations
 Higher Education
 Interim Committee on Manufacturing
 House and Senate Joint Committee on Higher Education Governance, Excellence and Transparency

83rd (2013)
 Elections
 General Investigating and Ethics (Vice Chair)
 Natural Resources (Vice Chair)
 Select Committee on Transparency in State Agency Operations
 House and Senate Joint Committee on Higher Education Governance, Excellence and Transparency

84th (2015)
 Homeland Security and Public Safety
 Economic and Small Business Development (Vice Chair)
 Calendars

85th (2017)
 Ways and Means
 Investments and Financial Services
 Redistricting (Vice Chair)
 Select Committee on State and Federal Power and Responsibility

Accomplishments
In 2012, Johnson was named to the American Council of Young Political Leaders (ACYPL) and joined an ACYPL delegation that visited Israel and the Palestinian Territories, meeting with current and emerging leaders in the region. In December 2012, Johnson was the only member of the Texas Legislature invited to participate in President Obama's first ever meeting with a delegation of African American state legislators. Johnson currently serves as chairman of the Business, Financial Services, and Insurance committee of the National Black Caucus of State Legislators and is one of the earliest members of the NewDEAL Leaders, a nationwide network of pro-growth progressive leaders.

In November 2013, The Aspen Institute selected Johnson for its Rodel Fellowship Program for Public Leadership. He was one of 24 public officials selected across the nation to be recognized for his commitment to effective and principled bipartisan governance.

In April 2016, Johnson was selected by the China-United States Exchange Foundation (CUSEF) as one of seven delegates from across the United States to travel to China as part of a bipartisan group of state and local elected officials to improve U.S.-China relations at the sub-national level. He was also selected by the German Marshall Fund as one of its 75 Marshall Memorial Fellows and recently traveled to four countries in Europe as part of this fellowship. Johnson was recently elected to serve on the Democratic Legislative Campaign Committee’s board of directors and most recently named to the Board of Advisors for Let America Vote, an organization founded by former Missouri Secretary of State Jason Kander that is dedicated to winning the public debate over voter suppression in the United States.

Mayor of Dallas

On June 8, 2019, Johnson was elected Mayor of Dallas, defeating his opponent, city councilman Scott Griggs, in a runoff election. It was announced that he would take office on June 17, 2019. With his election, Johnson became the second African American mayor to be elected in Dallas history (the first being Ron Kirk) and one of the youngest mayors of a major American city. He was sworn in as Mayor on June 17, 2019, by U.S. District Court Judge Sam Lindsay.

In August, it was announced Johnson took a job as a partner at Locke Lord. In September 2019, Johnson sent the Dallas City Council an open letter notifying them of plans by Interim CEO Sam Coats of Visit Dallas to eliminate Board seats allotted for the City.

Early in his term, Johnson also dealt with an EF-3 tornado in Dallas and pushed for federal assistance.

Johnson oversaw a budget that passed unanimously in 2019. But as budget season at City Hall started in 2020, Johnson began pushing an initiative to "defund the bureaucracy," a play on the Defund the Police slogan, which he was against. His proposals were rejected twice by the Dallas City Council. The rationale given by the mayor was since private sector employees were "feeling the pain" due to COVID-19 restrictions then public sector employees should as well. The first time Johnson brought up his proposals to "defund the bureaucracy," members of the Dallas City Council rejected it by a 13–1 margin. In September 2020, Johnson, who had vowed to take his plan to the public, published a message opposing police overtime cuts on NextDoor, which political opponents decried as inappropriate and attempted to brand as illicit. The Dallas City Council again rejected the "defund the bureaucracy" bid in a subsequent meeting and voted to cut the proposed police overtime budget by 25% over the mayor's objection.

Johnson did win support in the budget for nearly $4.5 million in funding for his Task Force on Safe Communities recommendations. He formed the task force after the death of Brandoniya Bennett, a 9-year-old girl who was killed in her own home by errant gunfire meant for someone else. The task force made four recommendations for fighting violent crime without law enforcement. The City Council later agreed to fund the programs.

In 2020, Johnson launched Dallas Works, a summer jobs program for Dallas youth. The program was modeled on other cities that had far more robust summer jobs programs than Dallas.

Johnson in 2021 pushed for a major increase in police hiring in Dallas. The City Council approved the plan, which called for an additional 200 officers over two years. Johnson also pushed back against efforts to cut into the police overtime budget, but was successful this time. After the budget passed, Johnson introduced an ethics reform package, which he called "historic." The plan's centerpiece was the hiring of an inspector general to prosecute ethical lapses.

Johnson has repeatedly said public safety is his top priority and began receiving national attention for his stances. In 2022, he advocated for a restriction on operating hours for Sexually Oriented Businesses to reduce violent crime.

As mayor, Johnson has also backed a "Back to Basics" and "Build for the Future" agenda that focused on lower property taxes, the creation of an economic development corporation for the city, a redo of the convention center, fixes for the permitting office, environmental resilience efforts, and street resurfacing.

COVID-19 response 
On March 11, 2020, Johnson announced the cancellation of the St. Patrick's Day Parade, an annual event that draws more than 100,000 people to Lower Greenville, because of concerns about COVID-19. The next night, after evidence emerged of community spread in Dallas, Johnson declared a local state of disaster.

The next week, the City Council extended the disaster declaration, and the mayor continued to enact regulations and restrictions. In an accompanying op-ed in The Dallas Morning News, Johnson wrote that "some of the measures we have taken — and actions we still may have to take — to stop COVID-19 may have seemed unimaginable a few months ago. The decisions I have made weighed heavily on me because of their economic implications. But life is priceless, and we must do what we can to protect it. That means we have to pay a price; many livelihoods will be temporarily affected."

Johnson created two COVID-19 recovery and assistance committees, started a private sector task force on economic recovery, pushed for Dallas County to begin reporting COVID-19 cases by ethnicity, required hospitals to report capacity numbers daily, and appointed a COVID-19 Health and Healthcare Access Czar. He also pushed for more testing in underserved communities and won multiple extensions of federal Community-Based Testing Sites. The two committees shepherded a relief package for small businesses and residents who were struggling to pay their mortgages or rent. The City Council also passed a "Dallas First" procurement plan that Johnson proposed to reward local firms bidding on city contracts, and passed an ordinance to delay evictions.

In January 2021, Johnson advocated for the City of Dallas to receive direct allocations of COVID-19 vaccines. The City of Dallas then received several direct allocations of vaccines that were distributed at the Kay Bailey Hutchison Convention Center and at The Potter's House.

Johnson publicly received the vaccine when he became eligible in January 2021 in an effort to discourage vaccine hesitancy. He contracted a breakthrough case of COVID-19 in October 2021.

Criticisms
At his inauguration, Johnson vowed to bring civility back to Dallas City Hall. This was a rebuke to what many saw as an aggressive style by some members of the Dallas City Council, which turned off some voters. Since becoming mayor, political opponents and online commentators has tried to portray him as unforgiving and demanding. In addition, online commentators have criticized him for occasionally missing parts of Dallas City Council meetings, over which he is the presiding officer. Johnson has also been engaged in political disputes with other government officials, including the city manager. In 2021, Johnson said he was "open to trying different things" and was later lauded by The Dallas Morning News for his committee assignments that seemed to embody a different approach in a new City Council term.

Performance of City Hall

As the COVID-19 pandemic began to strike Dallas, critics attacked Johnson's style after he became the Emergency Management Director for the City of Dallas, a designation that effectively took control away from the Dallas City Council and City Manager for pandemic response. Johnson had created COVID-19 City Council committees, but received additional criticism for taking away a co-chair designation from the committees.

Johnson was also targeted for protests over Shingle Mountain, a 190,000-ton mountain of roof shingles in debris occupying a private lot next to a few homes in southern Dallas, by local environmentalists demanding help from Dallas City Hall. After multiple public calls, activists launched a protest at Locke Lord, the law firm at which Johnson is a partner, even though the city had already approved a plan to remove the shingles, which were dumped there before Johnson was mayor.

During the 2020 DISD bond election, Johnson did not offer an explicit endorsement of the proposed bonds with his stated reason being he wanted to avoid a potential conflict of interest. Even though Johnson and his law firm are not representing the bond for Dallas Independent School District, the Mayor's spokesperson provided an updated statement by saying he "wants to avoid even the appearance of a conflict because he is a bond attorney." Tim Rogers, the editor of D Magazine who had previously attacked Johnson for various issues such as his attempt to get his boots fixed, blasted the mayor for not using the bully pulpit to support DISD.

Public disputes with officials
Johnson is known to engage in public disputes with government officials through the use of memos or other online communications. During Memorial Day weekend 2020, Mayor Johnson chastised the City Manager in a memo after a dispute over agenda items that led to Dallas City Council members skipping an ad hoc COVID-19 committee meeting.

Opposing Johnson has led to disputes ending with the public removal of Dallas City Council members from committees. This was reflected when Johnson removed a city councilmember from the Ad Hoc Committee on Legislative Affairs in August 2020. Political opponents seized on the fact that the councilmember was that five-member committee's only Latino member.

During the COVID-19 pandemic, Johnson engaged in several disputes with Dallas County officials leading the response. In a letter from Johnson to Dallas County Judge Clay Jenkins, the mayor expressed concern regarding the distribution of vaccines without his awareness and even threatened to cancel the city's health provider contract with Dallas County. In a response, Dallas County Judge Clay Jenkins explained he was balancing inequity with those who have not received the vaccine and took issue with Johnson's communication style by urging that next time he call him directly. Jenkins went so far as to state Johnson was undermining vaccine efforts in Dallas County through his actions. In response to Dallas City Council member Chad West, Judge Jenkins urged him and other public officials to spread the word on vaccine registrations. This led to several Dallas City Council members setting up various registration sites across several districts. After finding out, Johnson sent the City Manager a memo "ordering" he disregard the request of Dallas City Council members for city resources to set up registration hubs, instead asking the Office of Emergency Management to come up with a plan based on data. In light of the Mayor's memo, several Dallas City Council members called for a special meeting to discuss designating the City Manager, rather than Office of Emergency Management Director Rocky Vaz, as the official emergency management coordinator with the power to designate resources as well as communication protocols. Nothing ultimately came of the meeting.

Personal life

Johnson lives in Dallas with his wife Nikki and three children. In 2021, he became the first mayor in Dallas history to have a child while in office. He is a member of Mountain View Church of Christ.

See also
 List of mayors of the 50 largest cities in the United States

References

External links

 Office of Mayor Eric Johnson
 State Bar of Texas
 Eric Johnson for Dallas Mayor
 Andrews Kurth

 
|-

 

1975 births
21st-century American politicians
African-American mayors in Texas
African-American state legislators in Texas
Harvard College alumni
Living people
Mayors of Dallas
Democratic Party members of the Texas House of Representatives
Texas lawyers
University of California, Berkeley alumni
University of Pennsylvania Law School alumni
Princeton School of Public and International Affairs alumni
21st-century African-American politicians
20th-century African-American people
Orrick, Herrington & Sutcliffe people